Krydor is a village in the Canadian province of Saskatchewan within the Rural Municipality of Redberry No. 435 and Census Division No. 16. The community's name is a combination of the names of two early settlers, Petro Krysak and Teodor Lucyk (KRYsak + teoDOR). Petro Krysak also served as the first postmaster, from September 1, 1911, to July 7, 1913.

History 
Krydor incorporated as a village on August 25, 1914.

Demographics 

Notable people

 Mike Kostiuk (August 1, 1919 - July 26, 2015) was a National Football League offensive lineman.
 Darryl Melnyk (July 24, 1971 - present) was 1993 Fastball National Champion and 1994 Alberta Master Burbot Angler.
 Stephen Worobetz (December 14, 1914 - February 2, 2006) was 13th Lieutenant Governor of Saskatchewan.

See also 

 List of communities in Saskatchewan
 Villages of Saskatchewan

References

Villages in Saskatchewan
Redberry No. 435, Saskatchewan
Division No. 16, Saskatchewan
Ukrainian-Canadian culture in Saskatchewan